Sporting Chance (sometimes referred to by its original name, Sporting Chance Clinic) is a registered UK based charity set up by former Arsenal and England football captain Tony Adams to provide support to current and former professional athletes for a wide variety of mental and emotional health problems. Formed in September 2000, the charity provides support to current and retired athletes in three areas: education and training, one to one counselling (for any emotional or mental health issue) and a residential clinic set up specifically to treat addictive disorders.

On 27 September 2013, it was announced that former CEO Peter Kay had suddenly died aged 52.

Services

One-to-one therapy and triage

Sporting Chance offers access to a national network of therapists and counsellors, all are vetted as to their qualification, specialism, place of practice, that they are suitably insured, that they maintain personal supervision and of course, their geography. Sporting Chance’s diligence process mirrors that of the BACP (British Association of Counsellors and Psychotherapists) and the UKCP (United Kingdom Council for Psychotherapy). This service can be accessed through a stakeholder referral or directly via a 24-hour telephone line. This service delivers talking therapy and treatment solutions to a wide range of mental and emotional health presentations. Over a thousand current and retired professional athletes will use this service each year.

Residential treatment for addictive disorders
Sporting Chance provides the only residential treatment facility in the world for the treatment of addictive disorders exclusively working with professional athletes, based at Forest Mere Country Club near Liphook, Hampshire. The treatment models are suitable for those presenting with alcohol, substance and gambling problems that are considered symptoms of an addictive disorder. There are 3 treatment programmes delivered over different time spans, these are 5, 12 and 26 days. All are fully residential and tailored to an athlete, providing facilities and activities to enable any athlete to maintain the level of physical fitness they require to compete. The system is based on the twelve-step program of Alcoholics Anonymous. The aim is to provide a safe environment where the addict can begin a new life free from the drug or behaviour pattern that has been damaging them, their families and their sporting life. The philosophy is based on Adams's own experiences of his requirements as an athlete in his own recovery from alcoholism.

Education and training

The charity delivers education seminars and workshops to a range of audiences across sport, primarily the athletes themselves but also those who work directly with athletes and those who work for the leagues and governing bodies that run the sports in which the athletes take part. All content is tailored to the audience it serves taking into account the sport, the age group, audience members' roles within the sport and any potential learning blocks within the group. Subjects discussed include general mental health and wellbeing in a sporting context, transition, emotional resilience, the impact of social media, problematic gambling, illicit substance use and addiction.

Patrons 
The patrons include ex-Sports Minister Kate Hoey, former professional footballer Lee Dixon, Tony Smith, Irish Jockey Sir A.P McCoy, athlete Dame Kelly Holmes and musician Sir Elton John.

Stakeholders 
The clinic is supported by various sporting bodies and institutions including the Professional Footballers' Association, The Premier League, The Football Association, The Professional Cricketers' Association, Rugby League Cares, The Professional Jockeys Association.

References

Crabbe, T. (2000). A sporting chance?: using sport to tackle drug use and crime. Drugs: education, prevention and policy, 7(4), 2.

External links
Official website

2000 establishments in England
Drug and alcohol rehabilitation centers
Charities based in Hampshire
Sport in Hampshire
Sports medicine in the United Kingdom
Addiction organisations in the United Kingdom
Sports medicine organizations